"The First Step" (AKA: "The Morals of Diet") is an article by Leo Tolstoy primarily advocating for vegetarianism, but at the same time also briefly mentioning themes relating to anarchism and pacifism.  It was Tolstoy's preface to a book by Howard Williams (The Ethics of Diet), which Tolstoy translated into Russian.

Content

According to South African novelist Imraan Coovadia, writing in 2020, the article begins with a vivid description of the slaughter of a pig by a butcher armed with a butcher's knife; Coovadia notes that this is clearly in line with Tolstoy's style of "plainness and force."  While it is a book about the rights of animals, it also takes a decidedly religious tone, invoking that one must practice self-abnegation, fasting, and renouncing worldliness.  Ronald D. Leblanc, lecturer at University of New Hampshire, says that the essay is divided into two unequal halves, the first about religious and ascetic reasons for vegetarianism, while the latter half is about the humanitarian and ethical reasons for vegetarianism.  In addition, Tolstoy suggests that vegetarianism gives one sufficient strength to resist sexual impulses, which has drawn criticism from contemporary psychologists who describe the piece as "pseudo-erotic."  Tolstoy ends the piece taking a more psychological approach, suggesting that the killing and eating of animals deafens the sense of human beings to feel sympathy, pity, and compassion for others around them.

Legacy

This work was considered instrumental in convincing Gandhi to maintain his vegetarian diet.  According to Charlotte Alston, lecturer at Northumbria University, Tolstoy had planned to established a vegetarian journal in 1893, with the same title, The First Step.  In 1900, it was translated to English by the famous Tolstoy translators Louise Maude and Aylmer Maude, and in 1905 it was translated again by Leo Wiener.

See also
 Bibliography of Leo Tolstoy

References

External links
 Original Text
 The First Step, from RevoltLib.com
 The First Step, from Marxists.org
 The First Step, from Libcom.org
 The First Step, from TheAnarchistLibrary.org

Short stories by Leo Tolstoy
1891 short stories
Books about animal rights
Books about vegetarianism
English-language books
Vegetarian-related mass media